The Office of Foreign Assets Control (OFAC) is a financial intelligence and enforcement agency of the U.S. Treasury Department. It administers and enforces  economic and trade sanctions in support of U.S. national security and foreign policy objectives. Under Presidential national emergency powers, OFAC carries out its activities against foreign states as well as a variety of other organizations and individuals, like terrorist groups, deemed to be a threat to U.S. national security.

As a component of the U.S. Treasury Department, OFAC operates under the Office of Terrorism and Financial Intelligence and is primarily composed of intelligence targeters and lawyers. While many of OFAC's targets are broadly set by the White House, most individual cases are developed as a result of investigations by OFAC's Office of Global Targeting (OGT).

Sometimes described as one of the "most powerful yet unknown" government agencies, OFAC was founded in 1950 and has the power to levy significant penalties against entities that defy its directives, including imposing fines, freezing assets, and barring parties from operating in the United States. In 2014, OFAC reached a record $963 million settlement with the French bank BNP Paribas, which was a portion of an $8.9 billion penalty imposed in relation to the case as a whole.

History

Involvement of the U.S. Department of the Treasury in economic sanctions against foreign states dates to the War of 1812, when Secretary Albert Gallatin administered sanctions against the United Kingdom in retaliation for the impressment of American sailors.

The Division of Foreign Assets Control, the immediate predecessor to OFAC, was established in December 1950. Predecessor agencies of the Division of Foreign Assets Control include Foreign Funds Control, which existed from 1940 to 1947, and the Office of International Finance (1947 to 1950). OFAC's earliest predecessor, Foreign Funds Control, was established by Executive Order 8389 as a unit of the Office of the Secretary of the Treasury on April 10, 1940. The authority to establish Foreign Funds Control was derived from the Trading with the Enemy Act 1917. Among other operations, Foreign Funds Control administered wartime import controls over enemy assets and restrictions on trade with enemy states. It also participated in administering the Proclaimed List of Certain Blocked Nationals, or the "Black List", and took censuses of foreign-owned assets in the United States and American-owned assets abroad. Foreign Funds Control was abolished in 1947, with its functions transferred to the newly established Office of International Finance (OIF). In 1948, OIF activities relating to blocked foreign funds were transferred to the Office of Alien Property, an agency within the Department of Justice.

The Division of Foreign Assets Control was established in the Office of International Finance by a Treasury Department order in 1950, following the entry of the People's Republic of China into the Korean War; President Harry S. Truman declared a national emergency and blocked all Chinese and North Korean assets subject to U.S. jurisdiction. In addition to blocking Chinese and North Korean assets, the Division administered certain regulations and orders issued under the amended Trading with the Enemy Act. On October 15, 1962, by a Treasury Department order, the Division of Foreign Assets Control became the Office of Foreign Assets Control.

Authority and activities

In addition to the Trading with the Enemy Act and the various national emergencies currently in effect, OFAC derives its authority from a variety of U.S. federal laws, particularly the  International Emergency Economic Powers Act (IEEPA), regarding embargoes and economic sanctions.

In enforcing economic sanctions, OFAC acts to prevent "prohibited transactions", which are described by OFAC as "trade or financial transactions and other dealings in which U.S. persons may not engage unless authorized by OFAC or expressly exempted by statute". OFAC has the authority to grant exemptions to prohibitions on such transactions, either by issuing a general license for certain categories of transactions, or by specific licenses issued on a case-by-case basis. OFAC administers and enforces economic sanctions programs against countries, businesses or groups of individuals, using the blocking of assets and trade restrictions to accomplish foreign policy and national security goals. See United States embargoes for a list of affected countries.

Under the International Emergency Economic Powers Act (IEEPA), the U.S. President is empowered during national emergencies to block the removal of foreign assets under the jurisdiction of the United States. That mandate is executed by OFAC by issuing regulations that direct financial institutions accordingly.

Between 1994 and 2003, OFAC collected over $8 million in violations of the Cuban embargo, against just under $10,000 for terrorism financing violations. It had ten times more agents assigned to tracking financial activities relating to Cuba than to Osama Bin Laden.

As part of its efforts to support the Iraq sanctions, in 2005, OFAC fined Voices in the Wilderness $20,000 for gifting medicine and other humanitarian supplies to Iraqis. In a similar case, OFAC imposed and attempted to collect a $10,000 fine, plus interest, against peace activist Bert Sacks for taking medicine to residents of Basra; charges against Sacks were dismissed by the court in December 2012.

In October 2007, a set of Spanish travel agency websites had their domain name access disabled by eNom: the domain names had been on the OFAC blacklist. When queried, the U.S. Treasury referred to a 2004 press release that claimed the company "had helped Americans evade restrictions on travel to Cuba".

In the case of United States v. Banki, on June 5, 2010, a U.S. citizen was convicted of violating the Iran Trade Embargo for failing to request Iranian currency transfer licenses in advance from OFAC. On August 25, 2010, the Iranian American Bar Association announced that it would file an amicus curiae brief with the Court of Appeals for the Second Circuit on United States v. Banki.  It has also hired lawyers to request further guidance from OFAC on import of goods from Iran.

Appointment as director is not subject to Senate confirmation.

Specially Designated Nationals

OFAC publishes a list of Specially Designated Nationals (SDNs), which lists people, organizations, and vessels with whom U.S. citizens and permanent residents are prohibited from doing business. This list differs from the list maintained pursuant to Section 314(a) of the Patriot Act.

When an entity or individual is placed on the SDN list it can petition OFAC to reconsider. But OFAC is not required to remove an individual or entity from the SDN list. Two federal court cases have found the current Treasury/OFAC process to be constitutionally deficient.

In August 2009, a federal court ruling in KindHearts v. Treasury found that Treasury's seizure of KindHearts assets without notice or means of appeal is a violation of the Fourth and Fifth Amendments.

On September 23, 2011, the Ninth Circuit Court of Appeals upheld a lower court's ruling that procedures used by Treasury to shut down the Oregon-based Al Haramain Islamic Foundation in 2004 was unconstitutional. The court said the Fifth Amendment's guarantee of due process required Treasury to give adequate notice of the reasons it puts a group on the terrorist list, as well as a meaningful opportunity to respond. In addition, the court ruled that freezing the group's assets amounts to a seizure under the Fourth Amendment, so that a court order is required.

As of October 7, 2015, the SDN List had more than 15,200 entries from 155 countries. Of those, 178 entries were for aircraft and 575 entries were for ships ("vessels"). The remaining 14,467 entries were for designated individuals and organizations. OFAC creates separate entries in the SDN list for each alias of a designee, so the number of entries does not reflect the number of designees.

On September 21, 2021, a cryptocurrency exchange was included in the sanctions list for first time for helping launder illicit funds having source from ransomware attacks. The amounts laundered are more than $160 million between 2018 and 2021.

Sectoral Sanctions Identifications
OFAC publishes a list of Sectoral Sanctions Identifications (SSI), which lists persons, companies, and entities in sectors of the Russian economy (especially energy, finance, and armaments), prohibiting certain types of activity with these individuals or entities by United States persons, wherever located. This list is maintained following the issuance of EO 13662 Blocking Property of Additional Persons Contributing to the Situation in Ukraine on March 20, 2014, in accordance with 79 FR 16167.

On August 13, 2014, the United States Department of Treasury issued guidance for entities under sectoral sanctions. United States increased the number of entities on the sectoral sanctions identifications list by adding subsidiaries of entities under sectoral sanctions that hold 50% or greater ownership by an entity under sectoral sanctions either individually or in the aggregate, either directly or indirectly. Also, US persons cannot use a third party intermediary and they must use caution during "transactions with a non-blocked entity in which one or more blocked persons has a significant ownership interest that is less than 50% or which one or more blocked persons may control by means other than a majority ownership interest."

On December 22, 2015, the United States Department of Treasury explicitly listed all entities and their subsidiaries on the sectoral sanctions identifications list using a human readable search.

Sanctions programs

As of August 8, 2020, OFAC was administering the following sanctions programs:

Table note: The numbers of individuals, companies, vessels, and aircraft are taken from the SDN List. However, any single entry on that list may be a target of multiple sanctions programs, so summing lines of the table will inflate the true sum due to duplication.

See also
Anti-money laundering
Hawala
Title 31 of the Code of Federal Regulations
U.S. sanctions against Iran
United States embargoes
Specially Designated Nationals and Blocked Persons List

Further reading

 Bryan R. Early & Keith A. Preble (2020) "Going Fishing versus Hunting Whales: Explaining Changes in How the US Enforces Economic Sanctions." Security Studies.

References

External links

Government agencies established in 1950
International sanctions
Export and import control
Foreign Assets Control
Union of Good
1950 establishments in the United States